Carisbrook is a town in Victoria, Australia, located on the Pyrenees Highway,  east of the regional and local government centre of Maryborough, in the Shire of Central Goldfields. At the 2016 census, Carisbrook had a population of 1115.
Carisbrook is closely linked with Maryborough historically, socially and economically.

Transport
Carisbrook situated on the Pyrenees Highway between Maryborough and Castlemaine, with coach services to both of these towns.

The Moolort railway line is a partially closed railway line also connecting Maryborough to Castlemaine, via Carisbrook station and Moolort.

Media
The Carisbrook Mercury is a weekly newspaper distributed locally, based in Carisbrook Town Hall. The Maryborough Advertiser, distributed in the Central Goldfields region, and the regional radio station, Goldfields FM 99.1, are based in Maryborough.

Sport
The local Australian Rules football team is the Carisbrook Redbacks. They play in the Maryborough Castlemaine District Football League. The current coaches are Luke Treacy and Jackson Bowen. Their main motto at training is to "respect the bibs". The Maryborough Harness Racing Club has regular meetings at its racetrack, which is located near Carisbrook.
There is also a lawn bowls club, a gun club and a leisure centre.

Notable people 
 Aston, Matilda Ann (1873-1947) 
 Long, George Merrick (1874-1930)
 Russell, Percy Joseph (1861-1946)

See also

 Carisbrook railway station

References

Towns in Victoria (Australia)
Mining towns in Victoria (Australia)